Julio Domínguez (19 January 1898 – 11 October 1957) was a Spanish athlete. He competed in the men's individual cross country event at the 1920 Summer Olympics.

References

External links
 

1898 births
1957 deaths
Athletes (track and field) at the 1920 Summer Olympics
Spanish male long-distance runners
Olympic athletes of Spain
Athletes from Madrid
Olympic cross country runners